Louisa Martindale, CBE, FRCOG (30 October 1872 – 5 February 1966) was an English physician, surgeon, and writer. She also served as magistrate on the Brighton bench, was a prison commissioner and a member of the National Council of Women. She served with the Scottish Women's Hospitals at Royaumont Abbey in France in World War I, and as a surgeon in London in World War II. Through her writings she promoted medicine as a career for women.

Early life
Louisa Martindale was born in Leytonstone, Essex, the first child of William Martindale (c. 1832–1874) and his second wife Louisa, née Spicer (1839–1914). The family had a Congregational Church background. Her mother, "a champion of a larger life for women", was an active suffragist and a member of the Women's Liberal Federation, and of the executive committee of the National Union of Women's Suffrage Societies. In the 1880s, Mrs. Martindale held open house for Brighton shop girls on a regular basis, and young Louisa would have grown up in an environment supportive of her future career.

After the death of William Martindale the family moved to Cornwall, and thence to Germany and Switzerland, finally returning to England to live in Lewes, East Sussex. In 1885 the family moved again, this time to Brighton so that Louisa and her sister Hilda could attend Brighton High School for Girls (now Brighton Girls). From an early age it had been decided that Louisa should become a doctor, and at 17 she was sent to Royal Holloway, University of London in Egham and obtained her London Matriculation in 1892. She then entered the London School of Medicine for Women in 1893, gaining her MB in 1899, and her BS. In 1900 she went north to Hull as an assistant to Dr. Mary Murdoch, the beginning of her professional life. Murdoch and Martindale worked closely as they were partners in their business. In 1902 they went on a cycling holiday together visiting Vienna, Berlin and Switzerland. They were in partnership until 1906.

Professional life
After five years in Hull, in 1906 Martindale gained her Doctor of Medicine and returned to Brighton. She started her own general practice and very soon was asked to join the Lewes Road Dispensary for Women and Children (which in 1911 became the Lady Chichester Hospital, Brighton Branch) as a visiting medical officer. In 1920 she was instrumental in the setting up of the New Sussex Hospital for Women in Windlesham Road, Brighton, and held the post of senior Surgeon and Physician there until 1937. She left Brighton and Hove in 1922, moving to London to start a Surgical Consultant Practice but continued to operate part-time at the New Sussex Hospital.  After moving to London as a Consultant Surgeon, Louisa soon became known as honorary surgeon at the Marie Curie Hospital. In 1931, Martindale was elected as President of the Medical Women's Federation. She was appointed C.B.E. that same year. Two years later, she was elected a Fellow of the Royal College of Obstetricians and Gynaecologists. In 1937, Martindale was appointed to the Council of the Royal College of Obstetricians and Gynecologists as the first woman member in history.

Martindale's medical interests were sometimes controversial, especially her studies of venereal disease and prostitution. Her book Under the Surface (1909), in which she spoke quite openly about these very topics, apparently caused a stir in the House of Commons. She also laid the groundwork for research in the treatment of uterine cancer and fibroid growths in women by means of intensive X-ray therapy.

She secured a long and distinguished life and career in medicine, carrying out over 7000 operations. Her work brought her respect and acknowledgment from both her colleagues and her patients: she was made a Fellow of the Royal College of Obstetricians in 1933, and was a member of the Royal Society of Medicine. Eventually she became a specialist in the early treatment of cervical cancer by X-ray and she later lectured extensively throughout the UK, the United States, and Germany. 

In November 2022 the new £483 million building at the Royal Sussex County Hospital in Brighton, East Sussex was named after Louisa Martindale. It will be home to over 30 wards and departments and be kitted with state-of-the-art facilities.

Personal life
An active member of the Brighton Women's Franchise Society, she also served as Magistrate for many years on the Brighton bench, became President of the Medical Women's Federation in 1931, was a Prison Commissioner and a member of the National Council of Women. She served with the Scottish Women's Hospitals at Royaumont Abbey in France in World War I, and as a surgeon in London in World War II. Martindale never married and lived for more than three decades with another woman, Ismay FitzGerald (c. 1875–1946), daughter of Baron FitzGerald of Kilmarnock. Some scholars are wary of identifying Martindale as a lesbian. Geoffrey Walford, for instance, does not state whether Martindale's "woman-centered lifestyle" specifically entailed a lesbian relationship. Others are more explicit and unhesitatingly propose Martindale's lesbianism, referring for instance to her 1951 autobiography A Woman Surgeon, in which she writes quite openly and tenderly (though without giving explicit detail) about her love for FitzGerald.

Death
Martindale retired from practice in 1947. She died in her home in London on 5 February 1966, aged 93.

Works by Louisa Martindale
Under the Surface. Brighton: Southern Publishing Company, 1909.
The Treatment of Thirty-Seven Cases of Uterine Fibromyomata by Intensive X-Ray Therapy. 1920.
The Women Doctor and Her Future. London: Mills and Boon, 1922. Available online at Internet Archives.
Menorrhagia Treated by Intensive X-Ray Therapy. 1923.
Treatment of Cancer of the Breast. 1945.
The Artificial Menopause. 1945.
The Prevention of Venereal Disease. London: Research Books, 1945.
Venereal Disease, Its Influence on the Health of the Nation, Its Cure and Prevention. 1948.
A Woman Surgeon. London: Gollancz, 1951.

References

Sources
Brown, Val. Women's Hospitals in Brighton and Hove. Hastings: Hastings Press, 2006.
Delamont, Sara. "Martindale, Louisa (1872–1966)". Oxford Dictionary of National Biography. Oxford: Oxford UP, 2004.
LSMW Archive material at the Royal Free Hospital Archive.
Martindale, Hilda. From One Generation to Another: A Book of Memoirs, 1839-1944. London: George Allen & Unwin, 1944.
Wojtczak, Helena. Notable Sussex Women. Hastings: Hastings Press, 2008.

1872 births
1966 deaths
English surgeons
Commanders of the Order of the British Empire
LGBT physicians
English LGBT people
People from Leytonstone
English women medical doctors
Alumni of the London School of Medicine for Women
20th-century women scientists
Presidents of the Medical Women's Federation
Women surgeons
English justices of the peace
Alumni of Royal Holloway, University of London
20th-century English women
20th-century English people